Christopher Wood may refer to:
Christopher Wood (socialite) (1900–1976), partner of Gerald Heard
Christopher Wood (painter) (1901–1930), English painter
Christopher Wood (cricketer, born 1934) (1934–2006), English cricketer
Christopher Wood (writer) (1935–2015), English screenwriter and novelist
Christopher Wood (art historian) (born 1961), professor at New York University
Christopher Wood (composer), Welsh composer
Christopher Wood (biologist), professor of biology at McMaster University
Christopher Wood (financial analyst), managing director of the broking firm CLSA
Christopher Wood, who killed his wife, children, and himself in April 2009, around the time of the William Parente familicide
Christopher Wood, American R&B singer better known by his stage name Brent Faiyaz

See also
Chris Wood (disambiguation)